Padegan-e Hajj Ahmad Matuselyan (also Romanized as Pādegān-e Ḩājj Aḩmad Matūselyān) is a village in Howmeh Rural District, in the Central District of Andimeshk County, Khuzestan Province, Iran. At the 2006 census, its population was 411, in 112 families.

References 

Populated places in Andimeshk County